Avro Heritage Museum is an aviation museum in Woodford, Greater Manchester, England, that opened on 13 November 2015. It is located at the former Woodford Aerodrome, and it replaces the former Avro Heritage Centre.

History

Avro Heritage Centre
Originally opened as the Avro Heritage Centre in Woodford's personnel block, the centre had five rooms with displays and photos about Avro, an archive, and a small shop. It was only open for tours on Tuesdays and Thursdays, and visits were only possible by prior appointment.

Avro Heritage Museum
As part of the deal to sell Woodford Aerodrome for redevelopment in December 2011, BAE agreed to fund the renovation of the former aerodrome fire station to become the new Avro Heritage Museum. Designed to replace the previous heritage centre, the work was carried out by Conlon Construction and Cassidy + Ashton. Plans were submitted in February 2014; planning permission was approved on 20 May; construction started in August; and the museum opened 13 November 2015. At , the new building is 70% larger than the previous centre and includes an exhibition hall, a gallery, a cafe, reading rooms, and classrooms.

It holds the Avro Heritage Trust's collection of over 30,000 artefacts on aircraft development, including a set of murals that used to be located in Woodford's employee restaurant.

Aircraft on display

 Avro Vulcan B.2 XM603
 Avro Type F – Replica
 Roe I Triplane – Replica

Cockpits

 Avro Anson XIX G-AGPG
 Avro Lancaster B.I R5868 "S for Sugar" – replica
 Avro Vulcan B2 XM602
 English Electric Canberra WK118
 Hawker Siddeley 748 1756
 Hawker Siddeley Nimrod MR.2 XV235
 Vickers VC10 C1K XV106 – on loan

See also
List of aerospace museums

References

External links
 Avro Heritage Museum

2015 establishments in England
Museums established in 2015
History museums in Greater Manchester
Aerospace museums in England
Tourist attractions in the Metropolitan Borough of Stockport
Buildings and structures in the Metropolitan Borough of Stockport
Proposed museums in the United Kingdom
BAE Systems